Oshigambo High School, also Oshigambo Senior Secondary School, is a school in Oshigambo in the Oshikoto Region of northern Namibia. It is situated approximately 30 km east of Ondangwa.

Oshigambo High School is surrounded by some of the special features which make it a tourist attraction. The school buildings sandwich a river which flows from Angola to the Kunene River. On its shores there is the well-known fig tree omukwiyugwemanya, this name is derived from he nature of the tree, the fact that it grew on a rock.

Oshigambo High School is one of the oldest schools in the northern part of Namibia. It first came into existence in 1960 and was in good management of its first principal Toivo Tirronen, a Finnish national. Oshigambo High School is a missionary and church school of the Evangelical Lutheran Church in Namibia.

In 2006, Oshigambo River broke its banks for the first time in 50 years. The flood water separated the school from its hostel; learners and teachers who stayed at the other side of the river had to either pass through the river at own risk, or had to walk a distance of about 3 km to get to school. A bridge had been promised to be built by President Hifikepunye Pohamba.

The school receives voluntary teachers from the United States every 2 years. They mostly cater for the Math and Science subjects. It has about 20 teachers, of which most are foreigners and about 300 learners. It recently had its 50th Anniversary and a lot of people from different places were present.

The school's patrons are Solly Amadhila and Frans Indongo, the principal is Hendrick Shikonda. Oshigambo High School has a netball, soccer, volleyball and basketball team.

Academic excellence

The school is one of the best in the country producing competitive high achievers every year. It was the 5th best High School in Namibia in 2012, and the 7th best in 2013 and 2014. It is well known for its excellent grade 10 and 12 results and most of its graduates go and further their studies in Namibia, South Africa and other countries beyond. Over the years it has maintained great national position in the top 10 for the grade 10 results. It offers the science field in grade 11 and 12 which is a good choice for learners wanting to pursue medicine or engineering after high school. 

The school has approximately 340 learners with an average of 30 learners in each class. It offers classes from grade 8 to 12 with two classes for every grade. it has two hostels( male and female), a dining hall and a library. The hostels are separated by the river. 

The school is an Evangelical Lutheran school and has a pastor who gives sermons to the learners every Sunday. Learners are also required to attend morning and evening devotion Monday to Sunday.

Notable alumni
 Eddie Amkongo
 Nahas Angula
 Pendukeni Ivula Ithana
 Nangolo Mbumba
 Peter Nambundunga
 Sacky Shanghala

Further reading

References

Schools in Oshikoto Region
1960 establishments in South West Africa
Educational institutions established in 1960